Maria Gràcia Bassa i Rocas (1883 Llofriu - 1961 Buenos Aires) was a Spanish folklorist, poet, and journalist.

Life 
She was the daughter of Joan Bassa Bosch and Irene Rocas Romaguera. She researched language and folklore, with her mother. She was a teacher in Llofriu.

In 1907, she married Joan Llorens i Carreras, in Pineda de Mar. They moved to Argentina, and Maria continued to take an interest in and promotion of Catalan culture and Catalan language.

She contributed to La Chronique de Palafrugell and to Feminal, the feminist magazine published in Barcelona. She also participated in the Floral Games.

She died in 1961, in Buenos Aires.

Legacy 
On 27 February 2008, the Town Hall of Palafrugell dedicated a street in the Llofriu district to her.

Works 

 Esplais de llunyania (1919)
 Branca florida (1933)
 Els camins de la pampa argentina (1941) (unpublished)

Further reading

References

External links 
 Bassa i Rocas, Maria Gràcia, bib.uab.cat

1883 births
1961 deaths